Daisy Grace (born Daisy Ulrich Opie) was accused in 1912 of drugging her husband, Eugene H. Grace and then shooting him for his insurance money in Atlanta, Georgia. She was tried and found not guilty.

See also
List of unsolved murders

References

People from Atlanta
People from Philadelphia
Year of birth missing
Year of death missing